Mohd Fadhil Mohd Hashim (born 2 July 1983) is a Malaysian footballer who is currently playing for Kuala Lumpur FA. He started his professional career by playing for Selangor FA President Cup Team. In the 2006/07 season, he was promoted to play with the senior team.

Honours

Club

PDRM 
Malaysia Premier League: 2014

References
 Profile at sleangorfc.com 

Living people
Malaysian footballers
1983 births
PKNS F.C. players
Negeri Sembilan FA players
Selangor FA players
People from Selangor
Association football defenders